This is a list of the songs placed number one in the United States during 2021. The Billboard Hot 100 is a chart that ranks the best-performing songs in the United States. Its data is compiled by MRC Data and published by American music magazine Billboard. The chart is based on each song's weekly physical and digital sales collectively, the amount of airplay it receives on American radio stations, and its streams on online digital music platforms.

Twenty-four acts reached number one in 2021, nine of whom earned their first number-one single: Olivia Rodrigo, Daniel Caesar, Giveon, Silk Sonic, Anderson .Paak, Polo G, The Kid Laroi, Future and Jack Harlow. BTS scored three number ones while Rodrigo, Justin Bieber, Drake and Lil Nas X scored two each, as the only acts to achieve multiple number-one songs in 2021.

2021 marked the first calendar year since 1991 to have at least 10 songs reach number one on the Hot 100 by the end of May. BTS spent the most weeks at the top spot of the Hot 100 in 2021, with twelve non-consecutive weeks. Their single "Butter" is the longest running number-one song of 2021, spending ten weeks atop the chart. Rodrigo's "Drivers License" was 2021's longest running number-one single by a female artist, with eight consecutive weeks atop. Taylor Swift scored her career's eighth number-one song this year with "All Too Well (Taylor's Version)", which broke the 49-year-old Hot 100 record of Don McLean's "American Pie" (1972) to become the longest song of all time to top the chart, clocking at 10 minutes and 13 seconds.

Chart history

Number-one artists

See also 
 2021 in American music
 List of Billboard 200 number-one albums of 2021
 List of Billboard Global 200 number ones of 2021
 List of Billboard Hot 100 top-ten singles in 2021
 Billboard Year-End Hot 100 singles of 2021

References

Footnote

Citations 

United States Hot 100
2021
Hot 100 number-one singles